The West Indian cricket team toured Australia from October to December 2022 to play two Test matches and two Twenty20 Internationals (T20Is). The T20Is formed part of both teams' preparations for the 2022 ICC Men's T20 World Cup, while the Test matches formed part of the 2021–2023 ICC World Test Championship. In May 2022, Cricket Australia confirmed the fixtures for the tour.

Australia won the T20I series 2–0, and the Test series 2–0, retaining the Frank Worrell Trophy in the process.

Marnus Labuschagne scored 502 runs in the Test series, the most by any Australian in a two-Test series, surpassing Matthew Hayden's 501 against Zimbabwe in 2003–04.

Background

Originally, the tour was scheduled to take place in October 2020. On 28 May 2020, Cricket Australia confirmed the fixtures for the series. Originally, the matches would have been used as warm-up fixtures for the 2020 ICC Men's T20 World Cup. However, in July 2020, the International Cricket Council (ICC) postponed the T20 World Cup until 2021 due to the COVID-19 pandemic. In August 2020, the three T20I matches were also postponed due to the pandemic, and a fixture clash with the revised schedule for the 2020 Indian Premier League.

Squads

Shimron Hetmyer was ruled out after missing his flight to Australia and was replaced by Shamarh Brooks. Marcus Stoinis was ruled out due to an injury. On 6 October 2022, Cricket Australia announced that Mitchell Marsh would miss the second T20I due to a concern over his ankle injury. Before the start of the first Test, Raymon Reifer was ruled out of West Indies' Test squad due to a groin injury.
Ahead of the second Test, Lance Morris and Michael Neser were added to Australia's test squad,  whereas  Marquino Mindley was added to the West Indies' test squad.

Australia's Pat Cummins was ruled out of second test after not recovering from the quad strain he picked up in the first test, with Steve Smith was named captain for the match.

Warm-up matches

T20I series

1st T20I

2nd T20I

Test series

1st Test

2nd Test

Notes

References

External links
 Series home at ESPNcricinfo

2022 in Australian cricket
2022 in West Indian cricket
International cricket competitions in 2022–23
2022-23
Cricket events postponed due to the COVID-19 pandemic